Lukáš Rypl (born 11 December 1991) is a Czech Nordic combined skier. He was born in Kraslice. He competed in the World Cup 2015 season.

He represented the Czech Republic at the FIS Nordic World Ski Championships 2015 in Falun.

References

External links 
 

1988 births
Living people
Czech male Nordic combined skiers
People from Kraslice
Sportspeople from the Karlovy Vary Region